Bernhard Kruger may refer to:

 Bernhard Krüger (1904–1989), a German Schutzstaffel Sturmbannführer (Major) during World War II
 Bernhard Krueger (Moravian) (born 1908), German Moravian Church historian and superintendent in South Africa (born 1908)
 Caspar Bernhard Kruger (18th century), German salesman in Belgern and author of Richtig berechnete Tabellen ueber stehendes Holz nach dem Kubikfuss (Torgau, 1790)
 Bernhard Kruger (Catholic) (16th century), German clergyman in Kemnitz-Pritzwalk (1539)